Ceza is a Turkish rapper.

Ceza or CEZA may also refer to:
the town in South Africa, Ceza, KwaZulu-Natal
CEZA, the corporation controlling the Cagayan Special Economic Zone
Miodrag Stojanović "Čeza" of Supernaut (Serbian band)